Rodger Mell Smitherman (born March 2, 1953) is a Democratic member of the Alabama Senate, representing the 18th District since 1995. He is also a member of the Alabama Sentencing Commission. Smitherman was elected President Pro Tempore of the Alabama Senate on February 5, 2009. He is a graduate of the University of Montevallo and Miles Law School.

Smitherman's wife is current judge, former Birmingham City Councilor, and former Birmingham Mayor Carole Smitherman. They are the parents of four children. The Smithermans maintain a law practice in downtown Birmingham.

External links
Alabama State Legislature: Senator Rodger Mell Smitherman – official government website
Project Vote Smart – Senator Rodger M. Smitherman (AL) profile
Political profile at Bama Politics
Follow the Money – Rodger M. Smitherman: 2006 2002 1998 campaign contributions

1953 births
Living people
African-American state legislators in Alabama
Democratic Party Alabama state senators
Politicians from Montgomery, Alabama
University of Montevallo alumni
Miles Law School alumni
21st-century American politicians
Lawyers from Montgomery, Alabama
21st-century African-American politicians
20th-century African-American people